The  was produced during the early years of World War II for the Japanese Empire by the Kingdom of Italy (Type I is not a numeric symbol, it denominates Italian).

History
After the invasion of China in July 1937, all Arisaka production was required for use of the Imperial Army, so under the terms of the Anti-Comintern Pact, the Imperial Navy contracted with Italy for this weapon in 1937. The Type I is based on the Type 38 rifle and utilizes a Carcano action, but retains the Arisaka/Mauser type 5-round box magazine. The Type I was utilized primarily by Japanese Imperial Naval forces. It is chambered for the 6.5 x 50 mm cartridge. Approximately 120,000 Type I rifles were produced in 1938 and 1939, with 30,000 each manufactured by Beretta and Fabbrica Nazionale d'Armi, and 60,000 manufactured by the state arsenal in Gardone Val Trompia. The final shipment to Japan left Venice by submarine in 1941.

On the collector market in the United States, the Type I rifle is uncommon but not particularly popular among collectors. Since the heritage of the Type I rifle is both Japanese and Italian, it tends to be shunned by collectors of Japanese focus. The Type I never had the Japanese Imperial Chrysanthemum markings, or other markings that typically interest collectors of Japanese militaria. Many Type I rifles brought back to the United States as war trophies were reportedly captured at Kwajalein Atoll, the Philippines, or from Japan at the conclusion of hostilities.

See also
Type 30 rifle
Chiang Kai-shek rifle
Mosin–Nagant
Karabinek wz. 1929
Karabiner 98k
MAS-36 rifle
Mannlicher M1895

References

External links 
 Pictures of a Type I rifle
 Japanese Type I Carcano

Bolt-action rifles of Italy
World War II infantry weapons of Japan
Military equipment introduced in the 1930s